The National Provincial Championship, or NPC, was the predecessor to the current Air New Zealand Cup and Heartland Championship in New Zealand rugby. 1978 was the third year of the National Provincial Championship, Wellington were the winners of Division 1.

Division 1 Standings

These were the NPC Division 1 standings for the 1978 season.
A Win was worth 2 competition points, a Draw 1, a loss 0.
There were no bonus points on offer.

Table notes
Pld = Played
W   = Win
D   = Draw 
L   = Loss 
PF   = For (Total points scored)
PA   = Against (Total points scored against)
PD = Points difference
PTS = Competition Points

Promotion/Relegation
As the bottom placed North Island team, Hawkes Bay were automatically relegated.

Division Two North winner Bay of Plenty were automatically promoted to Division One.

South Canterbury faced Division Two South winner Marlborough. The match was tied 10-10, which meant South Canterbury remained in Division One.

Division Two Teams
Division 2 North (In Order of Final Placing)

Division 2 South (In Order of Final Placing)

Ranfurly Shield
Manawatu began the season as holders having defeated Auckland in the 1976 season. In 1978 they defended the Shield in 4 matches, extending their tenure to 13 successful defences before being defeated by North Auckland. North Auckland chose not to accept any more challenges in 1978 and thus held the Shield for the Summer.

Manawatu
beat West Coast        51-10
beat Horowhenua        42-14
beat Poverty Bay       24-0
beat Wellington        13-6
lost to North Auckland 10-12

National Provincial Championship
1